Randall Building may refer to any of several buildings listed in the National Register of Historic Places:

in the United States (by state)
Randall Building (Fort Wayne, Indiana)
Randall Memorial Building, Former (Blowing Rock, North Carolina)
Randall Building (Victoria, Texas)

See also
Randall House (disambiguation)